The decade of the 1730s in archaeology involved some significant events.

Explorations

Excavations
 Formal excavations continue at Pompeii.

Finds
 1738: First formal excavations of Herculaneum, sponsored by Charles III of Spain

Publications
 1732: John Horsley - Britannia Romana (posthumous).
 1735: Prospero Alpini - Historiæ Ægypti Naturalis (posthumous).
 1736: Francis Drake - Eboracum (Roman York)

Other events
 1731: December 8 - Antiquarian John Freeman buries a 'time capsule' in the grounds of his house at Fawley Court in England.
 1734: November 12 - Nicholas Mahudel reads a paper to the Académie des inscriptions et belles-lettres on Three Successive Ages of Stone, Bronze, and Iron, introducing the concept of the Stone, Bronze and Iron Ages.

Births
 1730: September 16 - William Hamilton, Scottish diplomat, antiquarian, archaeologist and volcanologist (d. 1803)
 1732: Luigi Lanzi, Italian archaeologist (d. 1810)
 1735: August 8 - Jérémie Jacques Oberlin, Alsatian archaeologist (d. 1806)

Deaths
 1732: January 12 - John Horsley, British archaeologist (b. c.1685)

References

Archaeology by decade
Archaeology